The ground state of a quantum-mechanical system is its stationary state of lowest energy; the energy of the ground state is known as the zero-point energy of the system. An excited state is any state with energy greater than the ground state. In quantum field theory, the ground state is usually called the vacuum state or the vacuum.

If more than one ground state exists, they are said to be degenerate. Many systems have degenerate ground states. Degeneracy occurs whenever there exists a unitary operator that acts non-trivially on a ground state and commutes with the Hamiltonian of the system.

According to the third law of thermodynamics, a system at absolute zero temperature exists in its ground state; thus, its entropy is determined by the degeneracy of the ground state. Many systems, such as a perfect crystal lattice, have a unique ground state and therefore have zero entropy at absolute zero. It is also possible for the highest excited state to have absolute zero temperature for systems that exhibit negative temperature.

Absence of nodes in one dimension 
In one dimension, the ground state of the Schrödinger equation can be proven to have no nodes.

Derivation 
The average energy in this state would be

where  is the potential.

With integration by parts:

Hence in case that  is equal to zero, one gets:

If  is small enough, this is always possible to do, so that    is continuous.

where  is the norm.

Note that the kinetic-energy densities hold  everywhere because of the normalization.

Now, consider the potential energy. For definiteness, let us choose . Then it is clear that, outside the interval , the potential energy density is smaller for the  because  there.

On the other hand, in the interval  we have

which holds to order .

However, the contribution to the potential energy from this region for the state  with a node is

lower, but still of the same lower order  as for the deformed state  , and subdominant to the lowering of the average kinetic energy.
Therefore, the potential energy is unchanged up to order , if we deform the state  with a node into a state  without a node, and the change can be ignored.

Thus the ground-state wave function cannot have a node. This completes the proof. (The average energy may then be further lowered by eliminating undulations, to the variational absolute minimum.)

Implication 
As the ground state has no nodes it is spatially non-degenerate, i.e. there are no two stationary quantum states with the energy eigenvalue of the ground state (let's name it ) and the same spin state and therefore would only differ in their position-space wave functions.

The reasoning goes by contradiction: For if the ground state would be degenerate then there would be two orthonormal stationary states  and  — later on represented by their complex-valued position-space wave functions  and  — and any superposition  with the complex numbers  fulfilling the condition  would also be a be such a state, i.e. would have the same energy-eigenvalue  and the same spin-state.

Now let  be some random point (where both wave functions are defined) and set:

and

with

(according to the premise no nodes).

Hence

for all .

But  i.e.,  is a node of the ground state wave function and that is in contradiction to the premise that this wave function cannot have a node.

Note that the ground state could be degenerate because of different spin states like  and  while having the same position-space wave function: Any superposition of these states would create a mixed spin state but leave the spatial part (as a common factor of both) unaltered.

Examples 

 The wave function of the ground state of a particle in a one-dimensional box is a half-period sine wave, which goes to zero at the two edges of the well.
 The wave function of the ground state of a hydrogen atom is a spherically symmetric distribution centred on the nucleus, which is largest at the center and reduces exponentially at larger distances. The electron is most likely to be found at a distance from the nucleus equal to the Bohr radius. This function is known as the 1s atomic orbital. For hydrogen (H), an electron in the ground state has energy , relative to the ionization threshold. In other words, 13.6 eV is the energy input required for the electron to no longer be bound to the atom.
 The exact definition of one second of time since 1997 has been the duration of  periods of the radiation corresponding to the transition between the two hyperfine levels of the ground state of the caesium-133 atom at rest at a temperature of 0 K.

Notes

Bibliography 
 

Quantum mechanics